August is a census-designated place (CDP) in San Joaquin County, California, United States. The population was 8,628 at the 2020 census, up from 8,390 at the 2010 census.

Geography
August is located at  (37.979890, -121.263984).

Demographics

2010
At the 2010 census August had a population of 8,390. The racial makeup of August was 3,914 (46.7%) White, 224 (2.7%) African American, 183 (2.2%) Native American, 358 (4.3%) Asian, 20 (0.2%) Pacific Islander, 3,110 (37.1%) from other races, and 581 (6.9%) from two or more races. Hispanic or Latino of any race were 5,897 persons (70.3%).

The census reported that 8,287 people (98.8% of the population) lived in households, 10 (0.1%) lived in non-institutionalized group quarters, and 93 (1.1%) were institutionalized.

There were 2,298 households, 1,234 (53.7%) had children under the age of 18 living in them, 1,040 (45.3%) were opposite-sex married couples living together, 485 (21.1%) had a female householder with no husband present, 249 (10.8%) had a male householder with no wife present.  There were 234 (10.2%) unmarried opposite-sex partnerships, and 28 (1.2%) same-sex married couples or partnerships. 391 households (17.0%) were one person and 134 (5.8%) had someone living alone who was 65 or older. The average household size was 3.61.  There were 1,774 families (77.2% of households); the average family size was 4.01.

The age distribution was 2,852 people (34.0%) under the age of 18, 957 people (11.4%) aged 18 to 24, 2,385 people (28.4%) aged 25 to 44, 1,605 people (19.1%) aged 45 to 64, and 591 people (7.0%) who were 65 or older.  The median age was 28.0 years. For every 100 females, there were 107.1 males.  For every 100 females age 18 and over, there were 107.6 males.

There were 2,560 housing units at an average density of 2,046.1 per square mile, of the occupied units 1,148 (50.0%) were owner-occupied and 1,150 (50.0%) were rented. The homeowner vacancy rate was 3.6%; the rental vacancy rate was 10.7%.  3,966 people (47.3% of the population) lived in owner-occupied housing units and 4,321 people (51.5%) lived in rental housing units.

2000
At the 2000 census there were 7,808 people, 2,412 households, and 1,736 families in the CDP. The racial makeup of the CDP was 51.33% White, 1.32% African American, 3.04% Native American, 3.24% Asian, 0.54% Pacific Islander, 34.13% from other races, and 6.40% from two or more races. Hispanic or Latino of any race were 55.97%.

Of the 2,412 households 41.0% had children under the age of 18 living with them, 45.1% were married couples living together, 18.2% had a female householder with no husband present, and 28.0% were non-families. 21.6% of households were one person and 9.2% were one person aged 65 or older.  The average household size was 3.23 and the average family size was 3.78.

The age distribution was 33.4% under the age of 18, 11.2% from 18 to 24, 29.6% from 25 to 44, 16.7% from 45 to 64, and 9.1% 65 or older.  The median age was 29 years. For every 100 females, there were 104.6 males.  For every 100 females age 18 and over, there were 103.2 males.

The median household income was $25,222 and the median family income  was $26,676. Males had a median income of $25,922 versus $20,317 for females. The per capita income for the CDP was $11,037.  About 28.0% of families and 29.8% of the population were below the poverty line, including 34.9% of those under age 18 and 11.3% of those age 65 or over.

References

Census-designated places in San Joaquin County, California
Census-designated places in California